Gołkowo or Gółkowo may refer to the following places in Poland:
Gołkowo, Lower Silesian Voivodeship (south-west Poland)
Gołkowo, Kuyavian-Pomeranian Voivodeship (north-central Poland)
Gołkowo, West Pomeranian Voivodeship (north-west Poland)
Gółkowo, Greater Poland Voivodeship (west-central Poland)